Michael J. Birkner is an American academic and author. He served as the Benjamin Franklin Chair of Liberal Arts at Gettysburg College from 2001 to 2016 and has taught at the school since 1989. Birkner is recognized for his biographies of presidents James Buchanan and Dwight Eisenhower, He served as the President of the Pennsylvania Historical Association from 2014 to 2016.

References 

American academic administrators
American writers
Gettysburg College faculty

Gettysburg College alumni
University of Virginia alumni
Living people
Year of birth missing (living people)